Alexander Carr "Whitey" Campbell (January 19, 1926 – November 3, 2015) was an American football, basketball, baseball player and coach.  He served as the head baseball coach at the University of Miami in 1958 and from 1960 to 1962 and at the University of Montana in 1966.

Born in New York City and raised in Caldwell, New Jersey, Campbell attended James Caldwell High School, where he graduated in 1944 and was inducted into the school's hall of fame in 1990.

Campbell died on November 3, 2015, in Rutherfordton, North Carolina, after suffering from Alzheimer’s disease.

References

External links
 

1926 births
2015 deaths
American football fullbacks
American men's basketball players
Kentucky Wildcats football coaches
Miami Hurricanes baseball coaches
Miami Hurricanes baseball players
Miami Hurricanes football coaches
Miami Hurricanes football players
Miami Hurricanes men's basketball players
Montana Grizzlies baseball coaches
Montana Grizzlies football coaches
Navy Midshipmen football coaches
New Orleans Saints coaches
High school basketball coaches in Florida
High school football coaches in Florida
James Caldwell High School alumni
People from Caldwell, New Jersey
Sportspeople from Essex County, New Jersey
Players of American football from New Jersey
Baseball players from New Jersey
Basketball coaches from New Jersey
Basketball players from New Jersey
Deaths from Alzheimer's disease
Neurological disease deaths in North Carolina